Kernig's sign is a test used in physical examination to look for evidence of irritation of the meninges. The test involves flexing the thighs at the hip, and the knees, at 90 degree angles, and assessing whether subsequent extension of the knee is painful (leading to resistance), in which case it is deemed positive. This may indicate subarachnoid haemorrhage or meningitis. Patients may also show opisthotonus—spasm of the whole body that leads to legs and head being bent back and body bowed forward.

Karl et al. noted much of the literature on Kernig's sign is old and they could find no randomised trials of it.  They also noted low sensitivity of 5% meaning absence of Kernig's sign does not rule out meningitis, specificity however is 95% so if positive then meningitis is very likely. Kernig's should not be relied on when meningitis is suspected and a lumbar puncture should be performed.

Name
The test is named after Woldemar Kernig (1840–1917), a Russian neurologist.

See also
 Brudziński's sign

References 

Medical signs